Stratus silvagenitus is a type of Stratus cloud. The word silvagenitus is derived from Latin, meaning "created from forest". This cloud type, as the name implies, forms in forested areas which are experiencing high relative humidity levels, for example, after precipitation has passed. Their formation is attributed to evaporation and/or evapotranspiration in forests. If the cloud is uniform, it’s a stratus silvagenitus cloud; if the cloud is ragged and wispy, then it would be a stratus fractus silvagenitus. These clouds typically form near the ground. The silvagenitus cloud variety only appears in the Stratus cloud species due to its mechanism of formation.

References

Cloud types